Sky Sport or Sky Sports may refer to:
Sky Group
Sky Sports, a group of sports television channels available in the UK and Ireland
Sky Sport (Germany), a group of sports television channels available in Germany, Austria and Switzerland, formerly called Premiere Sport
Sky Sport (Italy), a group of sports television channels available in Italy
Sky Sports (Mexico), a group of sports television channels available in Mexico and Central America.
Sky Sport (New Zealand), a group of New Zealand sports television channels